The Hungarian Socialist Workers' Party (MSZMP) was a small Marxist–Leninist communist party in Hungary, formed after a split in the Workers' Party in 1993 with the leadership of László Fazekas, Elemér Csaba and Tamás Hirschler. As of August 2010, the party had cadres in ten cities across Hungary and 130 members. 
The party's website http://mszmp.blogspot.com was last updated in 2014, and according to the official results at valasztas.hu the party did not participate in the Hungarian parliamentary elections since 2010. The party has a Facebook page, which was last updated in March 2021.

References 

1993 establishments in Hungary
Communist parties in Hungary
Political parties established in 1993